Everett Ben "Chris" Krug (born December 25, 1939) is a former Major League Baseball catcher.  Krug was signed by the St. Louis Cardinals as an amateur free agent in 1958.

Krug played in parts of three major league seasons, two (1965 and 1966) with the Chicago Cubs (who drafted him out of the Cardinals' system in the 1964 minor league draft) and one (1969) with the expansion San Diego Padres.

Post major league career, Krug started a company, Athletic Turfs, Inc. in his native California. Through this company, Krug was involved in building the field for the movie Field of Dreams. https://mlbpaainterns.mlblogs.com/one-degree-of-separation-264a392f612f

References
 Jane Leavy, Sandy Koufax: A Lefty's Legacy
 Peter Golenbock, Wrigleyville
 Rip Pallotta, "One Day in Mudville" (Chapter 3)

External links

1939 births
Living people
Baseball players from Los Angeles
Major League Baseball catchers
Chicago Cubs players
San Diego Padres players
Stockton Ports players
Hobbs Cardinals players
Tacoma Cubs players
Seattle Angels players
Tulsa Oilers (baseball) players
Dallas–Fort Worth Spurs players
Winnipeg Goldeyes players
Rochester Red Wings players
Winston-Salem Red Birds players
Mat-Su Miners players
Riverside Polytechnic High School alumni